College of Cape Town (CCT), is a public TVET College located in Cape Town, South Africa, in the province of Western Cape, and it mainly serves students from the Southern Suburbs, Northern Suburbs region, along with Klipfontein District. The college is one of the oldest TVET institutions in Cape Town. CCT was founded in 1900 making it the oldest TVET college in South Africa.

Through various campus, CCT has over 11 233 plus students. As a TVET colleges, the college offers both career-oriented vocational and occupational programmes in a wide range of fields.

CCT College operates nine campuses throughout the Western Cape Province.

History
It was founded in 1900 as a normal high school and took its present name in 2002, After transitioning to a college, its initial mission was to provide  education for Coloureds and black South Africans seeking tertiary education. On February 1, 2002, four former technical colleges; Athlone College, Cape College, Sivuyile College, and Maitland Technical College/Western Province Technical College were officially merged to become the College of Cape Town, this came after the South African government decided to rationalize TVET Colleges, which resulted in 150 colleges in South Africa being reduced to about 50.

Programs
The college is organized into 11 academic units:
Art and design
Beauty therapy
Building and civil engineering
Business student
Education and training
Electrical engineering
Hair care
Hospitality
Information and communication technology
Mechanical engineering
Travel and tourism

Entrance requirements 
Students need a school (National Senior Certificate (Grade 12)/General Education Certificate (GEC) (Grade 9), that would give them an opportunity to enter the college.

Campus construction
Through the years, as students enrollment increased, the campus gradually expanded:

References

External links
 
 College Of Cape Town Official CCT Facebook page

Higher education in South Africa
Education in Cape Town
Educational institutions established in 2002
2002 establishments in South Africa